Tiger swallowtail is a common name for several species of butterfly, including:
Papilio appalachiensis or Appalachian tiger swallowtail, endemic to the Appalachians
Papilio canadensis or Canadian tiger swallowtail, endemic to Canada
Papilio glaucus or Eastern tiger swallowtail, endemic to the Eastern United States
Papilio rutulus or Western tiger swallowtail, endemic to the Western United States and southwestern Canada

Animal common name disambiguation pages